Ludwigia alternifolia, commonly known as seedbox, bushy seedbox, rattlebox, and square-pod water-primrose, is a herbaceous perennial plant of the family Onagraceae (evening primrose family). It is native to central and eastern North America, growing in marshes, wet meadows, and swamps. It has yellow, four-petaled flowers and brown seed pods that are shaped like a cube.

Description
Leaves are deep green, sharply-pointed, and lance-shaped. The margins are smooth and sometimes slightly ciliate or reddish. The leaves either have short petioles or are sessile.

Flowers are usually single, growing from the leaf axils on upper leaves. They have four yellow petals and four light green sepals.

Etymology
The genus name Ludwiga is for the 18th century German botanist, Christian Gottlieb Ludwig. The species name alternifolia references the fact that the leaves are alternate.

Distribution and habitat
It is native to southern Quebec and Ontario to Kansas and south to Texas and Florida. It grows in habitats that have full to partial sun and wet to moist soil, such as marshes, wet meadows, and swamps.

References

External links

alternifolia
Flora of North America
Plants described in 1753
Taxa named by Carl Linnaeus